Harnett Regional Jetport  is a county-owned public-use airport in Harnett County, North Carolina, United States. The airport is located four nautical miles (7 km) northwest of the central business district of Erwin. It was formerly known as Harnett County Airport.

Although many U.S. airports use the same three-letter location identifier for the FAA and IATA, this facility is assigned HRJ by the FAA but has no designation from the IATA. The airport's ICAO identifier is KHRJ.

Facilities and aircraft 
It has one runway designated 5/23 with an asphalt surface measuring 5,000 by 75 feet (1,524 x 23 m).

For the 12-month period ending September 7, 2009, the airport had 51,300 aircraft operations, an average of 140 per day: 86% general aviation, 14% military, and <1% air taxi. At that time there were 53 aircraft based at this airport: 60% single-engine, 9% multi-engine, 4% jet and 26% glider.

References

External links 
 Harnett Regional Jetport at Harnett County website
  at North Carolina DOT airport guide
 Harnett Regional Jetport at AOPA web site
 

Airports in North Carolina
Buildings and structures in Harnett County, North Carolina
Transportation in Harnett County, North Carolina